Dante Adrián Senger (born 4 March 1983) is an Argentine former footballer.

Career 
He was FC Locarno's topscorer after the departure of Juan Sara.

External links
  
 
 Football.ch profile
  

1983 births
Living people
Argentine footballers
Argentine expatriate footballers
Argentine Primera División players
Swiss Super League players
Swiss Challenge League players
Estudiantes de La Plata footballers
Quilmes Atlético Club footballers
FC Locarno players
FC Lugano players
FC Aarau players
Neuchâtel Xamax FCS players
Expatriate footballers in Switzerland
Association football forwards
People from Juan José Castelli
Argentine people of Volga German descent
Sportspeople from Chaco Province